V-STOL Aircraft Corporation (sometimes written VSTOL Aircraft Corporation) was an aircraft manufacturer based in Fort Myers, Florida, United States. The company was owned by Venezuela STOL Aircraft C.A. and specialized in the design and manufacture of STOL kit aircraft for the North American market.

History
The company was founded by Dick Turner as a subsidiary of Venezuela STOL Aircraft.  V-STOL Aircraft Corporation carried out prototype and development work in Florida and produced small aircraft orders there, while main production was located in Caracas. Venezuela STOL Aircraft also produced the Venezuela STOL XC Aglite agricultural aircraft based on V-STOL designs for the South American market and other developing nations.

V-STOL Aircraft was preceded by Turner's earlier company, Starflight Manufacturing Inc, which was a pioneering ultralight manufacturer founded in 1980. That company produced the Starflight TriStar and the Starflight DBL, the first tandem-seat ultralight trainer. Those designs provided the basis for later V-STOL Aircraft models.

Turner gained early fame in the ultralight community as the manager of the US Ultralight Team that competed at the 1985 World Microlight Championships in France.

Aircraft

References

Defunct aircraft manufacturers of the United States
Homebuilt aircraft